Following are the results of the 1937–1938 Southern Oregon Raiders football teams.  The Southern Oregon University Raiders football team is a member of the National Association of Intercollegiate Athletics and is not associated with any conference. The team plays its home games at Raider Stadium, in Ashland, OR.

Southern Oregon's first football team was fielded in 1927.  In 1939, the school, which was from then to be called the Southern Oregon College of Education, stopped fielding a football team. The team would not return until the 1945 season.

1937

1938

† Homecoming

Southern Oregon Raiders football seasons